Tomislav Dokic (born ) is a Serbian male volleyball player. He is a part of the Serbia men's national volleyball team.

Sporting achievements

National team
 2016  FIVB World League

References

External links
 profile at FIVB.org

1986 births
Living people
Serbian men's volleyball players
Place of birth missing (living people)
Serbian expatriate sportspeople in Italy
Serbian expatriate sportspeople in Greece
Serbian expatriate sportspeople in Russia
Serbian expatriate sportspeople in the United Arab Emirates
Serbian expatriate sportspeople in Poland